Indian River starts at Spruce Lake and flows into West Canada Creek in Herkimer County, New York.

References

Rivers of New York (state)
Rivers of Hamilton County, New York